The Union of Independent Nigeriens (UNI) is a political party in Niger.

History
The UNI was established on 17 May 1999. In the October 1999 general elections it nominated Amadou Ali Djibo as its presidential candidate; he finished last in a field of seven candidates with 2% of the vote. The party also failed to win a seat in the National Assembly, after receiving 1.25% of the vote.

The party contested the 2004 general elections in alliance with the Nigerien Party for Democracy and Socialism and Union for Democracy and the Republic. It did not nominate a presidential candidate, but a joint list of the three parties won two seats in the National Assembly.

It contested the 2009 parliamentary elections alone, winning one seat. The party did not nominate a presidential candidate in the 2011 general elections, but retained its seat in the National Assembly. However, it lost its parliamentary elections in the 2016 general elections.

References

Political parties in Niger
1999 establishments in Niger
Political parties established in 1999